Finn is the first album by The Finn Brothers, a music project of New Zealand brothers Tim and Neil Finn.

The album was produced by Tchad Blake and the Finn Brothers in Auckland, New Zealand. The songs "Angel's Heap" and "Suffer Never" were both released as singles.

Track listing

Personnel 
 All instruments played by the Finn Brothers except bass guitar on "Kiss the Road of Rarotonga" by Dave Dobbyn.
 Engineered and mixed by Tchad Blake
 Assistant engineering by Nick Treacy and Nick Abbot
 Recorded and mixed at York Street Studios, Auckland, November 1994 – March 1995
 Cover painting by Neil Finn
 Design by Wayne Conway
 Kete by Ani O'Neill
 Photography by Kerry Brown and Darryl Ward

Charts

References

1995 debut albums
Tim Finn albums
Neil Finn albums
Albums produced by Tchad Blake
EMI Records albums
Parlophone albums
Discovery Records albums